Pylopaguropsis is a genus of hermit crabs containing the following species:

Pylopaguropsis atlantica Wass, 1963
Pylopaguropsis bellula Osawa & Okuno, 2006
Pylopaguropsis fimbriata McLaughlin & Haig, 1989
Pylopaguropsis furusei Asakura, 2000
Pylopaguropsis garciai McLaughlin & Haig, 1989
Pylopaguropsis granulata Asakura, 2000
Pylopaguropsis keijii McLaughlin & Haig, 1989
Pylopaguropsis laevispinosa McLaughlin & Haig, 1989
Pylopaguropsis lemaitrei Asakura & Paulay, 2003
Pylopaguropsis lewinsohni McLaughlin & Haig, 1989
Pylopaguropsis magnimanus Henderson, 1896
Pylopaguropsis mollymullerae Lemaitre, 2017
Pylopaguropsis pustulosa McLaughlin & Haig, 1989
Pylopaguropsis pygmaeus Rahayu & Komai, 2013
Pylopaguropsis rahayuae Asakura, 2010
Pylopaguropsis similis Rahayu & Komai, 2013
Pylopaguropsis speciosa McLaughlin & Haig, 1989
Pylopaguropsis teevana Boone, 1932
Pylopaguropsis vicina Komai & Osawa, 2004
Pylopaguropsis zebra Henderson, 1893

References

Hermit crabs